Great Is Our Sin is the sixth studio album by the American death metal band Revocation, released on July 22, 2016. It is the band's first album to feature drummer Ash Pearson, who replaced original drummer Phil Dubois-Coyne in 2015.

Release and promotion 
The release of Great Is Our Sin was first announced on May 24, along with the release of the first single "Communion". On June 9, the second song, "Monolithic Ignorance" was released as a lyric video via Stereogum. A lyric video for "Crumbling Imperium" premiered at Loudwire on June 23. David Davidson appeared on the MetalSucks podcast #153 to talk about Great Is Our Sin. "Profanum Vulgus" debuted on the podcast as well.

Track listing

Credits 
Writing, performance and production credits are adapted from the album liner notes.

Personnel

Revocation 
 Dave Davidson – lead guitar, lead vocals
 Dan Gargiulo – rhythm guitar, backing vocals
 Brett Bamberger – bass
 Ash Pearson – drums

Guest musicians 
 Marty Friedman – guitar solo on "The Exaltation"

Production and design 
 Revocation – production
 Zeuss – production, recording , mixing, mastering
 Tom Strom – artwork
 Brian Ames – layout

Charts

References

External links 
 
 Great is Our Sin at Metal Blade
 Great is Our Sin promotion site at Metal Blade
 Great is Our Sin at Revocation's official website

2016 albums
Albums produced by Chris "Zeuss" Harris
Metal Blade Records albums
Revocation (band) albums